The 1979–80 Tercera División season is the 3rd season since establishment as the fourth tier.

Group 1

Group 2

Group 3

Group 4

Group 5

Group 6

Group 7

Group 8

Playoffs

Tercera División promotion/relegation playoff

pen.) 

 

Promotion to Tercera: Europa Nava & Unión Club Astillero
Permanence in Tercera: Paterna, Horta, Toscal, Lemona & Ind. Melilla

Tercera División Relegation playoff

 
Permanence in Tercera: San Martín Sotr.
Relegation to Regional: Gim. Torrelavega

External links
www.rsssf.com

Tercera División seasons
4
Spain